The 2015 Japan college football season, play of college football in Japan organized by the Japan American Football Association (JAFA) at the Division I level, began on August 28, 2015, with the regular season ending December 13, 2015 with the 2015 Koshien Bowl.  The winner will advance to the Rice Bowl to play the champion of the X-League.

Conference standings

Conference summaries
Note: Records are regular-season only, and do not include playoff games.

Playoff bracket

Postseason Bowls

References

External links
American Football in Japan
Japan American Football Association (Japanese)
NFL Japan Standings (Japanese)

American football in Japan
JAFA Division I
2015 in American football